WIRE-CD, virtual and UHF digital channel 33, is a low-powered, Class A television station licensed to Atlanta, Georgia, United States. Its analog broadcast range reached into the inner suburbs. Previously an MTV2 affiliate, programming since digital conversion now consists entirely of infomercials. As WIRE-LP (before the upgrade to Class A), like most over-the-air MTV2 network affiliates, it was an affiliate of The Box until that network's acquisition by Viacom in 2001.  Owned by Viacom, MTV2 is one of the few cable networks that can be seen over the air.

History
It was originally assigned W13CQ on channel 13 in May 1992, but its construction permit expired in December 1993 without being built. It came back again as W40BI on channel 40, assigned in August 1995. It went on the air the following year in May as WIRE-LP. One program in the late 1990s was a live call-in psychic which aired nightly through New York City base WNYX-LD (channel 32). The station became WIRE-CA in September 2001.

Its original location was atop the octagonal Tower Place in Buckhead, immediately north of the intersection of major arterial roads Piedmont Road (Georgia 237) and Peachtree Road (Georgia 141), and just west of Lenox Square across the Georgia 400 expressway.

It later moved south-southeast to the WUPA tower south of Inman Park, and increased power to 150 kW.  The antenna still had a null to the west-southwest, however it was otherwise omnidirectional and covered most of the core metro area.  Several other stations are also on this tower.

The station had applied for a digital companion on channel 29, however WANN-CA (channel 32) was granted the construction permit for that channel.  In March 2009, WIRE's owners filed an informal objection against WANN's request for special temporary authority, stating it had until the following month to file a petition to deny.  The objection was dropped when the two stations began to work together, and late in the month WANN filed an application to modify its permit from atop the Bank of America Plaza in downtown Atlanta (where it shares an antenna with WANN's analog signal, and co-owned WTBS-LP (channel 26) and its permit for its digital signal on channel 30) to the east tower at the "Richland" site near North Druid Hills. This is the same tower and channel (29) as WIRE's digital application (made December 2008), but at higher power (15 kW versus 10 kW) and much higher height (by 92m).  It is possible for the two stations to share the digital station but remap to separate virtual channels, but it was unknown what their plans were.

In late summer 2009, the station was granted a construction permit to flash-cut to digital TV on its current channel and at its current location and height.  The same television antenna is used, but its maximum output direction is rotated from 80° to 340° true north, putting its null toward the south-southeast.  This "notch" pulls its service contour in that direction back to Stockbridge instead of McDonough, however+ even with just 3 kW (equivalent to 15 kW analog, by FCC standards for ATSC) it was predicted to reach much further in all directions than its most recent (since mid-2007) 55 kW analog, though ATSC predictions are almost always more than actual reception.  Once it received a license to cover in early November 2009, its broadcast callsign became WIRE-CD.

In late January 2010, it applied to increase power to 15 kW at the same location and height.

Digital channels
The station's digital signal is multiplexed:

, just after going on-air, all four digital subchannels carry different infomercials.  This may be as "filler" during program test authority, as a placeholder for eventual television networks, permanently as brokered programming, or a combination of the three.  PSIP labels channels 33.1 to 33.4 as WIRE-D1, WIRE-D2, WIRE-D3, and WIRE-D4.

On June 11, 2011, WIRE-CD launched Three Angels Broadcasting Network on DT4. It later carried programming from Video Mix TV.

References

External links

IRE-CD
Low-power television stations in the United States
Three Angels Broadcasting Network